Riverdale Presbyterian Church is a historic Presbyterian church located at 4761-4765 Henry Hudson Parkway in the Riverdale neighborhood of the Bronx, New York City.  It was designed in 1863 by architect James Renwick, Jr. The church is a fieldstone building in an English-inspired Late Gothic Revival style.  It was substantially enlarged in 1936.

The complex also includes a stone manse, the Duff House, also designed by Renwick, and a Stick Style cottage, called the Duff or Gardener's Cottage, built in 1875.  In his original design for the Duff House, Renwick combined a mansard roof with gables and dormers in the Gothic Revival style.

The complex was designated a New York City landmark in 1966, and was listed on the National Register of Historic Places in 1982.

The congregation established the Edgehill Church at Spuyten Duyvil in 1869 as a chapel; it is now an independent church.

See also
List of New York City Designated Landmarks in The Bronx
National Register of Historic Places listings in Bronx County, New York

References
Notes

External links
Official website

Presbyterian churches in New York City
Churches on the National Register of Historic Places in New York (state)
Queen Anne architecture in New York City
Gothic Revival church buildings in New York City
Churches completed in 1864
Churches in the Bronx
New York City Designated Landmarks in the Bronx
National Register of Historic Places in the Bronx